Neuroterus is a genus of gall wasps that induce galls on oaks in which the wasp larvae live and feed. Some species produce galls that fall off the host plant and 'jump' along the ground due to the movement of the larvae within.

Neuroterus saltatorius—formerly named Cynips saltatorius—produces such Mexican jumping bean-like jumping galls about 1 to 1.5 mm in diameter.

This genus was first described by Theodor Hartig in 1840. Like most oak gall wasps, Neuroterus species have two generations each year, one sexual and one asexual (or agamic). The galls induced by each generation of the same species are usually produced on different parts of the host plant.

Recent studies indicate this genus is poly- or paraphyletic, thus many species will likely be moved to other genera.

Species include:
Neuroterus albipes
Neuroterus alexandrae
Neuroterus aliceae
Neuroterus anthracinus
Neuroterus aprilinus
Neuroterus bussae
Neuroterus cerrifloralis
Neuroterus lanuginosus
Neuroterus numismalis
Neuroterus oblongifoliae
Neuroterus quaili 
Neuroterus quercusbaccarum
Neuroterus rosieae
Neuroterus saltatorius
Neuroterus serratae
Neuroterus stonei
Neuroterus tricolor
Neuroterus umbilicatus
Neuroterus valhalla

References

External links
 
 Gall Photo Gallery
 
 

Cynipidae
Hymenoptera genera
Taxa named by Theodor Hartig
Taxa described in 1840